This is a list of administrators and governors of Delta State, Nigeria, which was formed on 27 August 1991, when the old Bendel State was split into Edo State and Delta State.

See also
Nigeria
States of Nigeria
List of state governors of Nigeria

References

Delta
Governors